Eurhodope rosella is a moth of the family Pyralidae. It is found in southern and central Europe.

The wingspan is 15–20 mm.

The larva feeds on Scabiosa columbaria.

References

External links
 Swedish Butterflies and Moths

Moths described in 1763
Phycitini
Moths of Europe
Moths of Asia
Taxa named by Giovanni Antonio Scopoli